Seychelles coup d'état may refer to:

1977 Seychelles coup d'état
1981 Seychelles coup d'état attempt